Seiya Kobayashi (born 11 August 2001) is a Japanese luger who competes internationally.
 
He represented his country at the 2022 Winter Olympics.

References

2001 births
Living people
Lugers at the 2022 Winter Olympics
Olympic lugers of Japan
Japanese male lugers
21st-century Japanese people